Generoso Pompa (born 11 March 1952 in Alexandria) in art Gene, pseudonym of Generoso Pompa, Italian painter of contemporary art.

Biography
Born in Alexandria, Egypt on March 11, 1952, and has lived in Rome since 1962, where he graduated in mural painting from the St Giacomo Institute, (1995-1996). He began his career as a painter in the seventies, becoming familiar with artistic techniques by copying the works of the great masters of the past. Since the 1990s he has been working full-time, alternating surreal works with landscape pieces. The feature that makes Gene's painting recognizable is his relief technique, using a painting knife and brush to accomplish three-dimensional paintings in oil.

He has participated in more than 100 personal exhibitions as well as 600 national and International art exhibitions, member of the art association Cento Pittori via Margutta.  His work has also been shown in public and private galleries and museums. In 2013 his monograph was published by Giorgio Mondadori and edited by Giovanni Faccenda, Vittorio Sgarbi, Philippe Daverio, 2016 saw MyArt published with critical text written by Daniel Radini Tedeschi. In 2014 some of his works were part of the set design of the GEO program of RAI 3. He lives and works between Rome and Spoleto.

Bibliography

 Monograph, Gene Pompa: meraviglie di natura, by Giovanni Faccenda, Cairo, Milan, 2013. .
 Monograph, Gene Pompa: incontaminati paesaggi, by Vittorio Sgarbi, EA Editore, Palermo, 2014.
 Monograph, Gene Pompa by Vittorio Sgarbi, EA Editore, Palermo, 2016.
 Monograph, Dossier Gene, by Philippe Daverio, Art Now, Palermo, 2020.
 Catalog of Modern Art No. 53, in Giovanni Faccenda, "The Italian Astist from the early twentieth century to today"( Gli Artisti Italiani dal Primo Novecento ad Oggi) Giorgio Mondadori, Milan, 2017, pp. 400–401. .
 Catalog of Modern Art No. 54, in Giovanni Faccenda, "The Italian Artists from the early twentieth century to today"( Gli Artisti Italiani dal Primo Novecento ad Oggi) Giorgio Mondadori, Milan, 2018, pp. 411–412. .
 Catalog of Modern Art No. 55, in Giovanni Faccenda, "The Italian Artists from the early twentieth century to today"( Gli Artisti Italiani dal Primo Novecento ad Oggi) Giorgio Mondadori, Milan, 2019, pp. 392–393. .
 Monograph, Gene: Collana SIGNA ARTIS, by Philippe Daverio, Giovanni Faccenda, Vittorio Sgarbi, Giammarco Puntelli, Editore Giorgio Mondadori, Milan, 2020. .
 Catalog, Artisti '21. Annuario internazionale d'arte contemporanea, by Philippe Daverio, Vittorio Sgarbi, Gene Pompa on the cover, Art Now, Milan, 2021. .

Notes

External links

 
 Gene, pseudonym of Generoso Pompa, biography on Artprice.com

20th-century Italian painters
Italian male painters
21st-century Italian painters
Painters from Rome
Italian contemporary artists
1952 births
Living people
20th-century Italian male artists
21st-century Italian male artists
Italian people of Egyptian descent